Mount Tom may refer to:

Australia 
 Mount Tom, Queensland, a locality in the Gladstone Region

United States 
Any of 42 mountains in the United States,. including:
 Mount Tom (California), a peak in the Sierra Nevada
 Mount Tom (Connecticut), a small mountain in Mount Tom State Park
 Mount Tom (Massachusetts), a peak of the Metacomet Ridge in the Connecticut River Valley
 Mount Tom Range, the entire ridge along which Mount Tom lies
 Mount Tom State Reservation
 Mount Tom, Massachusetts, village at the foot of the mountain
 Mount Tom Station, a former power plant
 Mount Tom (New Hampshire), a summit in the White Mountains
 Mount Tom (Herkimer County, New York), an elevation in Herkimer County, New York
 Mount Tom (Rhode Island), a rocky prominence located in Arcadia State Park
 Mount Tom (Vermont), a summit of Woodstock, Vermont, and location of Marsh-Billings-Rockefeller National Historical Park
 Mount Tom (Washington)

See also 
 Tom Mount

References